The Le Royal, is one of the tallest buildings in Amman, Jordan. Located in the 3rd Circle area, the building serves as a host of Le Royal Hotel chain in addition to a shopping mall, cinemas and commercial offices. It is a major landmark in Amman and one of the tallest buildings in Amman.

The building's original cost of $200 million was increased to $350 million over the course of construction and it is also built in a modern way as a clad building.

The building is lit with colorful lights during the night. These lights are set to different colors on different nights, so the hotel can appear in many different colors depending on the night.

See also
 Amman
 3rd Circle
 List of tallest buildings in Amman

References

External links

 Official website

Hotels in Amman
Hotel buildings completed in 2003
Skyscrapers in Amman
Tourist attractions in Amman
Skyscraper hotels
Skyscraper office buildings
Retail buildings in Jordan